2149: The Aftermath (also known as ESC, Darwin, and Confinement) is a Canadian science fiction film directed by Benjamin Duffield and written by Robert Higden. The film stars Molly Parker, Nick Krause, Juliette Gosselin, Cassidy Marlene Jaggard, Jordyn Negri, and Daniel DiVenere.

Principal photography on the film commenced June 2014 in Greater Sudbury, Ontario, Canada, and wrapped-up July 2014. Suki Films is producing the film with Nortario Films, based in Greater Sudbury. The film was financed by Telefilm Canada, the Northern Ontario Heritage Fund Corporation, the Ontario Media Development Corporation, and the Harold Greenberg Fund. It is scheduled for release summer 2016.

Plot 
Set in an oppressive, post-apocalyptic future, resulting from a world-wide biological war, survivors live in small cement modules with little more than a computer which connects them to their job, food and entertainment.  After nine years, a young man (portrayed by Nick Krause) is forced out into the real world when his module is left without power by a lightning strike and discovers truths about that world and his own life that he never dreamed of.

Cast

Release 
Suki International has set the film for a winter-spring 2016 release.

Filmed in the summer of 2014, this movie has had 4 different titles. It started as "ESC," then became "Darwin," then became "Confinement," and the latest is "2149: The Aftermath"

It was released on Amazon Prime in November 2021 under the title 2149: The Aftermath.

References

External links 
 

2016 films
2016 science fiction films
Canadian post-apocalyptic films
Canadian science fiction films
English-language Canadian films
Films shot in Greater Sudbury
2010s English-language films
2010s Canadian films